Xenopterella obliqua is a species of fly in the family Lauxaniidae.

References

Lauxaniidae
Insects described in 1926
Diptera of North America